Bolt of lightning may refer to:
 Lightning strike, an electric discharge between the atmosphere and the ground
 Bolt of Lightning (sculpture), a 1984 sculpture by Isamu Noguchi located in Franklin Square in Philadelphia, Pennsylvania

See also
 ...Like a Bolt of Lightning, a 2004 EP by Juliette and the Licks
 Lightning bolt (disambiguation)